Ungdommens Naturvidenskabelige Forening (UNF) is an association for young Danish people interested in science. It was founded in 1944 by interested high school teachers who were members of the society for the spreading of knowledge of the natural sciences. The primary purpose of the association is to promote science to youth and give the already interested youth the possibility to gain a deeper insight in science.

The national association, UNF Danmark, has seven local chapters in the major cities; Copenhagen, Aarhus, Odense, Lyngby, Esbjerg, Slagelse, and Aalborg.

ScienceCamps 
Every year during the school summer holidays (July–August), UNF organises the so-called ScienceCamps. The aim of these ScienceCamps is to give young people an opportunity to meet others with similar interests and to spread interest in specific science subjects.

Over the years, UNF has organised ScienceCamps in the fields of Mathematics, Computer Science, Biotechnology, Physics, Chemistry, Medicine, Environmental Technology, ScienceShow, Game Development and Software Development.

Published material 
A series of teaching material and a children's book have been published by the organization and is available on Danish libraries.

References

External links 
 The official homepage (English)
 The official homepage (Danish)
 UNF København (Danish)
 UNF Aarhus (Danish)
 UNF Odense (Danish)
 UNF Aalborg (Danish)
 UNF Lyngby (Danish)
 UNF Slagelse (Danish)
 UNF Roskilde (Danish)
 UNF Esbjerg (Danish)

Youth organizations based in Denmark
Scientific organizations based in Denmark